Church of Holy Trinity was a Serbian Orthodox Church located in the village of Velika Reka, in the municipality of Vučitrn, in Kosovo and Metohija. It belonged to the Diocese of Raška and Prizren of the Serbian Orthodox Church.

The history of the church 
The church was constructed in 1997 on the foundations of an older church that was built in 1926 by Serbian Colonel Milan Pribićević and his wife Ruža. Newly built church was founded and constructed by Dimitrije and Ljiljana Ljiljak.

The destruction of the church in 1999 
On 20 June 1999, shortly after the arrival of the French KFOR troops, the church was dynamited, burned and then destroyed to the ground. On the part of the churchyard the Albanians built the school and the mosque. All the centuries-old oak trees that were near the church were cut down and taken away.

References

External links 
 The list of destroyed and desecrated churches in Kosovo and Metohija June-October 1999 (Списак уништених и оскрнављених цркава на Косову и Метохији јун-октобар 1999)
 Deleted church, jedinstvo.rs

Serbian Orthodox church buildings in Kosovo
Destroyed churches in Kosovo
Former Serbian Orthodox churches
20th-century Serbian Orthodox church buildings
1926 establishments in Europe
Churches in Vushtrri
Persecution of Serbs
Religious organizations established in the 1920s
Religious buildings and structures converted into mosques
Cultural heritage of Kosovo